Mavlyutovo (Mäwlit) is a rural locality (a village) in Mavlyutovsky Selsoviet, Mishkinsky District, Bashkortostan, Russia. The population was 23 as of 2010. There are 2 streets.

Geography 
Mavlyutovo is located 19 km north of Mishkino (the district's administrative centre) by road. Staroatnagulovo is the nearest rural locality.

References 

Rural localities in Mishkinsky District